Malte Mohr (born 24 July 1986) is a German pole vaulter. At the 2009 World Athletics Championships, Mohr finished in 14th place with a vault of 5.50 metres. At the 2010 IAAF World Indoor Championships, Mohr was runner-up behind Steve Hooker with a vault of 5.70 metres.

Career
He was eliminated in the qualifying round of the 2009 European Athletics Indoor Championships, but two years later he reached the podium at the 2011 European Indoors with a clearance of 5.71 m for the bronze medal. He reached 5.85 m at the 2011 World Championships in Athletics, which brought him fifth place. He placed one position higher than that at the 2012 IAAF World Indoor Championships.

After winning at the 2012 German Athletics Championships, he improved his personal best to 5.91 m at a meeting in Ingolstadt in June 2012. Mohr was nominated to participate in the men's pole vault at the 2012 Summer Olympics in London, where he finished in 9th place with a vault of 5.50 m.

Competition record

Personal bests

See also
 Germany all-time top lists - Pole vault

References

External links 
 
 
 

1986 births
Living people
German male pole vaulters
German national athletics champions
Sportspeople from Bochum
Athletes (track and field) at the 2012 Summer Olympics
Olympic athletes of Germany